Sebastián Faena is a photographer, singer-songwriter and filmmaker.

Early life
Faena was born and raised in Buenos Aires, Argentina. He studied literature and music at Columbia University.

Career 
His first feature film premiered as a work in progress at the 2007 Mar Del Plata Film Festival, where the lead actress, Dolores Fonzi, won Best Actress.

Over the last decade, he has shot editorials for magazines Vogue Italia, Harper's Bazaar, Vanity Fair, Pop, CR Fashion Book, V Magazine and many others, starring supermodels like Cindy Crawford, Naomi Campbell, Gigi Hadid, Cara Delevingne and celebrities such as Lady Gaga, Rihanna, Penelope Cruz, Sigourney Weaver amongst others.

He directed a short film 'Those Wrecked by Success' in 2015, starring Gigi Hadid, as a special project with V Magazine.

In 2016 he was named Photographer of the Year at the Fashion Media Awards, awarded by Celine Dion and Carine Roitfeld.

He premiered his short film Fernando, at the Palais des Festivals et des Congrès during the 2018 Cannes Film Festival.

In 2021, he released his first EP with songs 'Save Your Life' (featuring Gray Sorrenti) and 'Artificial Irresistible'.

References

External links

Fashion photographers
Argentine film directors
People from Buenos Aires
Living people
1990 births